Yeo Tung Siong is a Malaysian politician from DAP. He is the Member of Johor State Legislative Assembly for Pekan Nanas from 2013 to 2022.

Early career 
He was a teacher and a Deputy Headmaster of Pei Chun High School.

Politics 
He was the special assistant of former Skudai state assemblyman, Boo Cheng Hau. He has been a member of DAP Johor Executive Committee since 2014, and the Chairman of Pakatan Harapan and DAP Tanjung Piai.

Election result

External links

References 

Democratic Action Party (Malaysia) politicians
Malaysian people of Chinese descent
Living people
1979 births
Members of the Johor State Legislative Assembly